The Stanjevići Monastery is located north of the town of Budva, Montenegro. Founded by Nikola Stanjević, the monastery is remembered as the Prince-Bishopric of Montenegro and the place where the praviteljstvo suda (judicial administration) and zakonik (legal code) for Montenegro and the Brda was promulgated and enacted in 1798 by 50 members of the council and Vladika Petar I Petrović-Njegoš. It is also considered the cultural centre of the Paštrovići.

See also
 List of Serbian monasteries

References 

Eastern Orthodox monasteries in Montenegro
Budva